An index mineral is used in geology to determine the degree of metamorphism a rock has experienced. Depending on the original composition of and the pressure and temperature experienced by the protolith (parent rock), chemical reactions between minerals in the solid state produce new minerals. When an index mineral is found in a metamorphosed rock, it indicates the minimum pressure and temperature the protolith must have achieved in order for that mineral to form. The higher the pressure and temperature in which the rock formed, the higher the grade of the rock.

The concept traces its roots to 1912, when G. M. Barrow mapped zones of metamorphism in southern Scotland. Each zone is named for the index mineral that appears in it. E.g. the chlorite zone is named for chlorite.

Mineralogic zones 
Mudrock, a fine-grained sedimentary rock often containing aluminium-rich minerals, produces these minerals after being metamorphosed, from low to high grade:
Chlorite zone: quartz, chlorite, muscovite, albite
Biotite zone: quartz, muscovite, biotite, chlorite, albite
Garnet zone: quartz, muscovite, biotite, garnet, sodic plagioclase
Staurolite zone: quartz, muscovite, biotite, garnet, staurolite, plagioclase
Kyanite zone: quartz, muscovite, biotite, garnet, kyanite, plagioclase, +/- staurolite
Silimanite zone: quartz, muscovite, biotite, garnet, sillimanite, plagioclase

See also 
Metamorphic facies
Metamorphic zone
Index fossil

References 

Marshak, Stephen. Earth: Portrait of a Planet, Norton, 3rd ed. 2007 

Mineralogy
Metamorphic petrology